Charles Bartholomew Bass is a fictional character in the novel and television series Gossip Girl. In the TV series, he is portrayed by English actor Ed Westwick. Although he is a secondary antagonist in the original book series, the TV series elevates him to an antiheroic main character, and the male lead of the show, where he is noted for his financial ambition, hedonism and personal style.

Since they were children, Chuck has been best friends with Nate Archibald, Serena van der Woodsen and Blair Waldorf, who is his main romantic interest throughout the series. In the TV series, he is also step-brother to Serena and Eric van der Woodsen.

Novel series
Chuck Bass is introduced by author Cecily von Ziegesar in her Gossip Girl series of teen novels, the first of which was published in 2002. In the novels, Chuck is a relatively minor character, and has a series of flings with male and female characters across the course of the series. He got his nickname, Chuck Bass, from his signature chuckle in a bass tone, which often sounds like a raspy whisper. Chuck's role is initially that of an antagonist to the main characters. Chuck resides with his family at the Plaza Hotel on the Upper East Side and attends school at the Riverside Preparatory School for Boys on the Upper East Side, along with scholarship student Dan Humphrey. Chuck is largely lonely as his only friends are Blair, Chuck, Nate and Serena, but is tolerated by the others because of his family's enormous wealth. He is described as having flamboyant fashion sense, with a penchant for scarves, and has a pet monkey named Sweetie. Lazy, and vain, Chuck's only interests are sex and money, and he is frequently chided by his father for lacking ambition and performing poorly in school. Following flings with numerous females and males, his only serious relationship comes near the end of the series, when he begins dating Blair Waldorf, a self-obsessed, luxury loving teenager. In the twelfth book in the series, Gossip Girl: It Had To Be You (2007), Chuck is rejected from colleges because of poor grades and is sent to military school by his father. When next mentioned in Gossip Girl spin-off, The Carlyles (2008), it is stated that Chuck never showed up to military school, and his whereabouts thereafter are unknown. In the thirteenth Gossip Girl novel, I Will Always Love You (2009), it is revealed that Chuck went off to school in California and returned a changed man, and to have dated main character Blair Waldorf in Oxford, England for a year.

TV series

Constance Billiard School is an exaggerated version of Gossip Girl author Cecily von Ziegesar's alma mater, the Nightingale-Bamford School. It was revealed in preparation for the 2007 TV series debut, Josh Schwartz hired recent graduates of Ziegesar's alma mater to retool several characters.

Chuck Bass was then reconfigured as a more central character, an antiheroic playboy whose on-off relationship with Blair Waldorf serves as one of the show's major ongoing storylines. Chuck is the resident "bad boy" of the Upper East Side, and like Blair, is both vengeful and manipulative; the two often scheme elaborate plans together. As the show progresses, Chuck develops a softer side, specifically towards Blair, his chief love interest, and Lily, Eric, and Serena, his adoptive mother, brother, and sister.

Season 1
Chuck grew up on the Upper East Side with his three best friends and fellow elites Nate Archibald, Blair Waldorf, and future-stepsister Serena van der Woodsen. His father is Bart Bass, a self-made billionaire, which is irregular, compared to the Bass' old money friends. Although, he is popular in school, he doesn't have many friends as  those are his only friend, and it's learned that others hang out with him due to his father wealth. Chuck is often described as the "bad boy of his circle." Chuck is a playboy and womanizer who sees women as recreational tools. Chuck frequently skips class and smokes cannabis.

In the pilot episode, Chuck attempts to rape both Serena and Jenny Humphrey. When speaking about Serena in the pilot episode, Chuck says, "Serena looked effin' hot last night. There's something wrong with that level of perfection. It needs to be violated." With time, he attenuates his behaviors as a sexual predator and becomes more of a manipulating womanizer.   However, his lecherous attitude continues as he makes multiple advances on his step-sister at the time, Serena.

In episode seven, "Victor/Victrola", Chuck purchases a burlesque club, Victrola. After Nate and Blair break up, Blair visits Chuck at Victrola where she ends up performing on stage. She later loses her virginity to him in the back of his limousine. Though she tries to deny the encounter, Chuck buys a necklace for her and admits that he feels "butterflies" in her presence, leading to a clandestine sexual relationship. Despite this, Nate and Blair rekindle their relationship, leading to a jealous Chuck revealing to the anonymous "Gossip Girl" that Blair and Chuck had a sexual relationship. This leads Chuck to have a temporary rift with both Blair and Nate.

As Bart Bass and Lily van der Woodsen's relationship progresses, they decide to move their families in together. Chuck and Eric van der Woodsen, Lily's son and Serena's younger brother, become especially close. When Serena begins receiving mysterious packages (pornography in the mail, alcohol delivered to her at school), she automatically blames Chuck. Given the creepy remarks Chuck has made about "bathing together" and "turning that onepiece into a no-piece." Serena is not to blame. Bart subsequently forces Chuck to move out of the family home. Serena discovers that the culprit was actually Georgina Sparks, a past classmate of both Serena and Chuck. It is later revealed that Chuck lost his virginity to Georgina in the sixth grade. Chuck and Blair join together to prevent Georgina from further harming and embarrassing Serena. This process rekindles their bond, and they succeed in getting rid of Georgina.

At Bart and Lily's wedding at the end of Season 1, Chuck apologizes and confesses to Nate that he was in love with Blair. During the wedding reception, Chuck gives a speech about forgiveness that is implied to be directed towards Blair. She accepts his apology and the two kiss. However, as they are about to embark on a trip to Tuscany together, Chuck gets cold feet. Blair leaves for Tuscany without him, as Chuck has decided to seduce Amelia, tossing the roses for Blair in the trash can.

Season 2
In the season premiere, "Summer Kind of Wonderful", we learn Blair has stayed in Europe. Chuck regretted his actions but told this to Blair too late as she was already dating Lord Marcus Beaton. Blair asks Chuck to tell her he loves her, but his fear of commitment stops him.

In order to gather material for a story, Dan tags along with Chuck for a night, ending with the two of them in jail after a fistfight. While in jail, Chuck tells Dan in confidence that Chuck's mother died while giving birth to him, and that his father blames him for her death, which explains their icy relationship. When Chuck later discovers that Dan was using him for a story, he feels betrayed and tells Dan that he was lying about all of it.

Chuck's storyline throughout season 2 mainly deals with his inability to tell Blair that he loves her. Eventually, his father is killed in a car accident. Then as he is about to leave after the funeral. Blair tells him that she loves him, but he leaves nevertheless. Lily adopts him so that he's able to own Bass Industries, making Serena and Eric his sister and brother. When Blair begins dating Nate again, Chuck realizes his true feelings for her. The two team up to take down Poppy Lifton, and Blair realizes that she still has feelings for Chuck as well. She breaks up with Nate. After finding out through a GossipGirl blast that Blair had sex with his uncle, he leaves after Blair tells him she loves him for the second time. In the final episode of season 2, Chuck admits to Blair his true feelings and the two finally begin a relationship.

Season 3
When Season 3 returns, Chuck and Blair are very happy and very much in love. Chuck struggles to run Bass Industries to his deceased father's impeccably high standards. He buys The Empire Hotel. Halfway through the season, Chuck meets a woman claiming to be his mother called Elizabeth Fisher. After initially rejecting her, Chuck finally accepts Elizabeth and is then met with a sexual harassment claim from his former employees. Despite his innocence, he settles to keep the scandal out of the media. Jack Bass, Chuck's sinister uncle, informs the media anyway and necessitates Chuck signing the hotel over to Elizabeth to appease the public. She betrays him and signs the hotel over to Jack, whom she loves. However, she calls Chuck to say goodbye and reveals that Jack chose the hotel over her. She then reveals to Chuck that she is not his mother and she does not know whether his real mother is alive or dead.

Chuck and Blair agree to team up to take down Jack to get the hotel back. Jack tells them both (separately) that he will only give up the hotel if he has sex with Blair. Unbeknown to Blair, Chuck sets the situation up and Blair goes to Jack's. After a kiss, Jack tells Blair the truth about Chuck's involvement. Blair breaks up with Chuck and he gets the hotel back, vowing to get Blair back too. Chuck tries desperately to win Blair back, doing everything from banning all of the other Upper East Side men from dating her to asking her to meet him on top of the Empire State Building. Blair decides that Chuck is her true love and she's going to meet him, but Dorota suddenly goes into labor and she ends up being two hours late. Chuck, thinking she is finally over him, leaves the building heartbroken and nearly suicidal. When he gets home, he sees that Jenny Humphrey has arrived looking for Nate. The two drunkenly sleep together, heartbroken that their true loves don't return their feelings.

Blair appears later in Chuck's suite, apologizing for being late, and the two reunite (sleep together). Chuck is about to propose to Blair at the hospital, as they visit Dorota and her new baby, when Dan appears and rashly delivers a punch to Chuck's face. He then forces Chuck to tell Blair what happened between him and Jenny. Blair breaks things off with Chuck and informs him that it's over for good. She also threatens to ruin Jenny's life if she doesn't leave Manhattan immediately. Chuck then travels to Prague to escape New York for a while, feeling as though he has nothing left. He gets robbed by two muggers who insist on taking the ring that Chuck intended on proposing to Blair with and when Chuck puts up a fight, he gets shot. The last shot of season 3 is him lying in an alley, presumably dying.

Season 4
In the first episode of season four, we find that Chuck is alive and well, having been rescued by Czech girl, Eva (Clémence Poésy) who has no idea of his wealth or who he is. He creates a fake name and persona as he no longer wants to be the manipulative Chuck Bass. He eventually reveals who he really is and returns to New York City with her, at the request of Blair and Serena. Blair insists she no longer loves him, but still schemes to undermine his new relationship. He eventually falls for one of her schemes and breaks up with Eva. He realizes his mistake and begs her to take him back, but she refuses, saying that he showed his true feelings by continuing to believe Blair over anyone else.

Chuck asks Blair whether she still has feelings for him, and she denies it, prompting him to declare "war" on her. He tries to "take" Columbia from her, and arranges for Jenny Humphrey to return to the city in order to stir up trouble for Blair, who still hasn't told her minions why she banished Jenny from the Upper East Side in the first place. After Jenny declares that it's only a matter of time before they both destroy each other, Chuck and Blair agree to a truce. They even draw up a contract, with the stipulation "no touching," but their mutual attraction proves too powerful and they soon fall into an enemies-with-benefits relationship.

In "The Witches of Bushwick", Chuck accidentally tells Blair during foreplay that he loves her and, not knowing whether his words are true, Blair chooses to gloss over the moment. Although Chuck and Blair spend the episode striving for different ends which will eventually alienate each other (Blair to become the face of Anne Archibald's charity, Girls Inc, and Chuck to increase the revenue of The Empire by returning to his bad boy persona), Blair makes the decision to attend Chuck's Saints and Sinners party in order to confront him. Chuck confesses that he loves her, and the pair kiss in front of everyone after the curtain concealing them is pulled down. Anne tells Blair that she can no longer be a part of Girls Inc just as Chuck's publicist KC tells Chuck that she thinks Blair will be good for business. Blair re-thinks her decision to sacrifice it all for their relationship, and she and Chuck break up once again. Chuck promises he'll wait for her, and both affirm their belief that their love will reunite them in the end.

On Thanksgiving Chuck and Blair run into each other at Serena's house, Chuck offers to leave but she tells him that she was heading to JFK anyway and came to drop off the traditional pie and that they should get used to this. They hear about Serena being hospitalized and while they're sharing that maybe nothing can change between them, Jenny walks in and interrupts their conversation. While driving Blair home, Chuck tells her that he showed up only for Serena. When she told him that what happened with Serena made her question what she told him after the Saints & Sinners party; Chuck tells her that he cannot be her friend now as much as he wishes he could. After that Blair still sends him her traditional pie, saying that even if they can't be friends it doesn't mean that they aren't.

In "The Townie" episode, It was revealed that Lily was going to sell Bass Industries instead of giving Chuck the company back. So he sets off to New Zealand, where his uncle Jack Bass is currently living. In the following episodes Chuck returns to the Upper East Side with revenge for Lily. Chuck's new love interest is Raina and her father is Russell Thorpe, a former rival of Chuck's late father Bart Bass. Russell is the main contender to buy Bass industries. Chuck, however, manages to save the company after it is revealed that Russell accidentally killed his wife in a building fire that Bart was originally accused of.

In "The Princess and the Frog" he learns that Blair's relationship with Louis is serious, and that there is talk about them getting engaged. He gets drunk and embarrasses Blair in front of Louis' mother, and later tries to force himself on her, while pushing her down and smashing a glass window right next to her face, after she tells him about her engagement. Blair ends up with her cheek being cut.

Later, Blair is kidnapped by Russell, but Chuck saves her, and the two go to a Bar Mitzah. There, the two are seen dancing and smiling happily. Blair pulls him off the dance floor into a private room and the two have sex. Blair decides she is going to leave Louis, but Chuck stops her, telling her that she needs to be with Louis because he makes her happy. At the end of the episode, Chuck decides to spend the summer traveling with Nate.

Controversy

Following the 20th episode of Season 4, Safran spoke on behalf of the series regarding the scene in which Chuck became violent with Blair.

Season 5
In the first episode of season 5, we find out that Chuck has spent his summer traveling the world with Nate. The two arrive in Los Angeles to meet up with Serena, who is working as an assistant on a film set. Seemingly over his break up with Blair, Chuck exhibits a positive outlook on life, telling Serena and Nate that he's seeking to experience everything he can in life. However, his heartbreak soon becomes apparent when he receives an invitation to Blair's upcoming wedding, which causes him to drive recklessly and get into a motorbike accident. In the following episode, it is revealed that Chuck has an emotional disorder as a result of his losing Blair, and which now causes him to be numb to physical and emotional stimuli. Dan decides to help Chuck break through this emotional barrier, and gets him a dog, hoping to spark some emotion. However, it is only when Blair reveals to him that she is pregnant with Louis's baby does Chuck begin feel again – he is shown crying over the revelation at the end of the episode. He names the dog "Monkey" (a homage to the pet monkey Chuck's character had in the books). He forms a reluctant friendship with Dan from here on.

He meets a psychiatrist, Eliza Barnes, who tells him that he acts out because he never had a childhood, and needs help. When he finds himself falling back into his old patterns, he calls Dr. Barnes, ready to seek that help. However, it is revealed that Blair's fiancé, Louis, gives Dr. Barnes money to upset Chuck, in hopes that he will do something reckless and drive Blair away forever. When Chuck finds this out, he publicly exposes both Dr. Barnes and Louis, leaving Blair devastated. Later that same night, he goes to Blair's apartment to finally apologize to her for all the times he's hurt her and let her down. His apology recounts all the obstacles Chuck and Blair have faced in their relationship thus far, and prompts an emotional Blair to thank him. Chuck assures her that she is going to be "an amazing mother", having come to terms with her relationship with Louis.

He resolves to keep his distance from her after that, but in "The Big Sleep No More", a conflicted Blair seduces him in the hope to prove that his efforts to be a better man is just a ploy to win her back. When he kisses her, she slaps him, and tells him that he will never change. It is later revealed that he conspired with Dorota and kissed Blair in order to confirm her suspicions of him, and push her back to Louis. In the episode "Riding in Town Cars with Boys" he admits to Blair that he still loves her. They profess their love for one another in Chuck's limo. This occurs whilst the limo is being chased by paparazzi on motorbikes and results in a car crash. Lily reveals at the conclusion of the episode that Blair is awake and doing fine, but whether or not Chuck has survived was not revealed.

We later discover that Chuck did indeed survive the accident after a blood transfusion was donated to him. He wakes up to a very distant Blair, very opposite to the one he got into an accident with. For the next few episodes he chases her to discover what has changed her mind – unbeknownst to him, Blair has made a pact with God over his life, where if she breaks her promise to Louis, Chuck will surely die. This leads to Blair going to Chuck's penthouse in the episode "The End of the Affair" where she tells him what a good man he has become and to not let the ending of their relationship destroy him.

In G.G., Chuck is willing to accept the fact that Blair is marrying another man, when Blair's mother tries to convince him to stop the wedding. He makes one final play for Blair, but Blair – despite saying that she "loves him more and more every day, if it's even possible to love somebody that much" – once more rebuffs him, saying that she's actually doing this for him. Their conversation is unknowingly recorded, and released in a blast by Gossip Girl during the wedding. Despite this, Blair still marries Louis, but flees the reception with Dan when Louis reveals that their relationship is now strictly business.

With the help of Dan, Blair tries to leave for the Dominican Republic to get a divorce from Louis without his consent due to a loophole in the Dominican Republic's law, but forgets her passport. Chuck, Nate and Serena eventually find Blair hiding out in a hotel room with Dan. However, Sophia finds Blair and threatens to forcefully sell Eleanor's company as dowry if Blair chooses not to return. Blair reluctantly goes back to Louis, despite an offer from Chuck to pay her dowry.

In "Cross Rhodes", Blair realizes she now has feelings for Dan, and Chuck and Serena struggle with watching their loves with their friends.

In "The Princess Dowry", Chuck pays Blair's dowry so she can be free, but wishes for it to remain a secret. She finds out and accuses him of wanting to own her. He admits that he paid the dowry, but for her freedom and her freedom only. At the end of the episode, Blair begins a relationship with Dan.

In "Con Heir", Chuck invites his uncle, Jack, back to New York to thank him for saving his life in the car accident by donating blood, but starts to doubt Jack's story when Chuck investigates and learns that Jack was recently diagnosed positive with Hepatitis C, and a test on Chuck turns to be negative. This kicks off a lot of "mother/father" issues for Chuck – he believes that it was Elizabeth Fisher who donated the blood, then Diana says that she is his mother when Bart cheated on Elizabeth with her (she claims that an arrangement was made with Diana leaving town alone, leaving Chuck to be raised by Bart and Elizabeth because Elizabeth couldn't get pregnant), but in "Despicable B", Nate receives a picture from Elizabeth that indeed shows her pregnant with Chuck. Chuck is more interested in the man in the picture with Elizabeth – his face is cut out, but his tattooed arm is still visible. Jack Bass has exactly the same tattoo.

It all comes to a head in "Raiders of the Lost Art", when he, Blair, Serena, Nate and Lola team together to crack the code in Diana's day planner – the code they believe will lead them to Jack Bass. They end up at a brothel that Diana is in charge of. Diana realizes that they are there and has the event shut down. During the chaos, Blair searches one of the rooms, still looking for Jack, and is shocked by what she sees. Blair later tells Chuck to re-enter the building once everyone is gone, which he does, and it is revealed that Bart Bass is still alive.

Bart reveals that he faked his death to save Chuck and Lily, and has been hiding from everyone for the past three years. The car crash actually happened, and that it was ordered by one of Bart's enemies. When he was in the hospital, he paid the doctor to say he died and then recruited Diana Payne to help him hide. Diana kept Bart informed of when Chuck was in trouble, so when Chuck was in the hospital, Bart was the one who donated his blood to save Chuck.

In "The Return of the Ring", Bart drops the bombshell that he will be returning to Bass Industries as "the only Bass in Bass Industries", pushing Chuck out of the company. Bart tells Chuck that the most he did was 'redecorate' and give everything up for Blair. After this, Blair declares her love for Chuck, admitting she finally really wants them to be together. Chuck rejects her in anger, shadowing the words she once said to him: "I don't want to be Mr. Blair Waldorf."

Chuck pairs up with an unlikely partner – Jack – to take down his father. They meet in a casino in Monte Carlo. Blair turns up, informed by Jack of Chuck's whereabouts. Blair reveals she is 'all in' and one hundred per cent ready to be with him. His decision on the matter is thus far unknown.

Season 6
At the beginning of the season Chuck and Blair make a pact not to be together until Blair succeeds at Waldorf Designs and Chuck takes down Bart. After many failed attempts of taking down Bart, Bart and Chuck end up in a fight. This leads to Bart falling off a building and dying. Blair is the only witness to this event and so Chuck and Blair get married so Blair does not have to testify against Chuck.

In the 5-year flash forward, Chuck and Blair are happily married with a son (Henry). They are all gathered at the Bass house for Dan and Serena's wedding.

Characterization
Ed Westwick who portrays the character on the television series said: "As the [first] season's progressed, I think everyone's had sympathy for him. I think he's an alluring character; he's very interesting. He has these slices of his personality. He can be the devil, but at times he can be very charming. It can be a very dangerous concoction. I think he has a good heart, but his heart is often tempted by corrupt desires." He later added: "He's intelligent and quite slimy in the way he manipulates to his gain. He goes after what he wants. Sometimes that's not a good thing. He's got a long way to go before he's a nice guy." Westwick also said: "Chuck's just this vain kind of metrosexual Manhattan eccentric living in a flash world." While describing Chuck as "mischievous", Westwick noted the second season displayed a "more good-guy" side of him. Ultimately, he said Chuck is a "kid trying to find his way in the world."

Denise Martin of the Los Angeles Times characterizes him as more of "a would-be Casanova than a seasoned predator. He's the charming devil at the center of all the intrigues, the go-to guy when something naughty needs to be said and he's the most self-aware of the Upper East Side high schoolers.

Stephanie Savage, one of the television series' creators, described him as "entertaining and observationally smart, he's the friend who says all the things you want to say but can't, and he tempts you in ways, at that age, you want to be tempted." She compared his relationship with Blair to Glenn Close and John Malkovich's in Dangerous Liaisons. She found Westwick's portrayal of Chuck was similar to James Spader of Pretty in Pink and Robert Downey, Jr.

Savage said about the character's evolution during the six seasons: "I feel like Chuck has gone on the biggest journey of any one on the show. In the pilot, he's pretty much a pure villain. He's not a character that has a lot of layers. That was something Ed Westwick really brought as an actor. And his chemistry with Leighton [Meester] — when we saw them together on screen and the power of the two of them working together but also being attracted to each other, which really inspired us to grow that character and give him some more layers."

Reception

Entertainment Weekly named Chuck Bass and Blair Waldorf number one in their "Best Dressed TV characters of 2008" list, as well as in their "Best Performances" list for Ed Westwick, alongside co-star Leighton Meester. His relationship with Blair was included in TV Guide'''s list of "The Best TV Couples of All Time" as well as Entertainment Weekly "30 Best 'Will They/Won't They?' TV Couples". The character also made the "Forbes Fictional 15" ranking at number 13 with an estimated $1.1 billion fortune.

In February 2012, Zap2it held a poll to determine TV's Most Crushworthy. Chuck was elected TV's Most Crushworthy 1% Male over Oliver Queen of Smallville''. The 1 percenters are people that "have everything going for them with their fantastic good looks and their opulent lifestyle".

References

American male characters in television
Characters in American novels of the 21st century
Fictional bisexual males
Fictional characters from Manhattan
Fictional domestic abusers
Fictional LGBT characters in literature
Fictional socialites
Gossip Girl characters
Male characters in literature
Orphan characters in literature
Teenage characters in literature
Teenage characters in television

fi:Chuck Bass